, nicknamed So, is a Japanese professional basketball player who plays for Bambitious Nara of the B.League in Japan. He also plays for Japan men's national 3x3 team.

Non-FIBA Events statistics 

|-
| align="left" | 2013
| align="left" | Universiade Japan
|7 || || 15.10 ||.550  || .250 ||.733  || 2.7 ||1.3  || 0.7 ||0.0  || 5.1
|-

Career statistics

Regular season 

|-
| align="left" | 2011-12
| align="left" | Nippon Tornadoes
| 1||1 || 48.0|| .304|| .000|| .250|| 7.0|| 1.0|| 1.0|| 0.0|| 15.0 
|-
| align="left" | 2014-15
| align="left" | Hitachi
| 37||1 || 9.1|| .417|| .190|| .586|| 1.1|| 0.2|| 0.2|| 0.1||  2.9 
|-
| align="left" | 2015-16
| align="left" | Hitachi
| 30|| || 6.9|| .440|| .400|| .769|| 0.8|| 0.3|| 0.2|| 0.1|| | 2.0 
|-
| align="left" | 2016-17
| align="left" | Shibuya
| 57||2 || 8.9|| .430|| .367|| .619|| 1.2|| 0.4|| 0.2|| 0.0|| | 1.9 
|-
| align="left" | 2017-18
| align="left" | Osaka
| 49||9 || 14.5|| .439|| .292|| .745|| 1.2|| 1.2|| 0.5|| 0.1|| | 4.4 
|-
| align="left" | 2018-19
| align="left" | Osaka
| 60||12 || 15.9|| .398|| .283|| .492|| 1.1|| 0.9|| 0.3|| 0.1|| | 3.7 
|-

Early cup games 

|-
|style="text-align:left;"|2017
|style="text-align:left;"|Osaka
| 3 || 0 || 15.17 || .625 || 1.000 || .667 || 1.7 || 0.7 || 0 || 0 || 4.3
|-
|style="text-align:left;"|2018
|style="text-align:left;"|Osaka
| 2 || 2 || 20.03 || .444 || .000 || .500 || 3.0 || 1.0 || 0.5 || 0 || 5.0
|-

Personal
He tied the knot to Mika Kurihara, a professional basketball player for the Toyota Antelopes in 2017.

External links

References

1991 births
Living people
Japanese men's basketball players
Japan national 3x3 basketball team players
Nippon Tornadoes players
Osaka Evessa players
Sportspeople from Osaka Prefecture
Sun Rockers Shibuya players
Forwards (basketball)